Epirrhoe plebeculata is a species of geometrid moth in the family Geometridae. It is found in North America.

The MONA or Hodges number for Epirrhoe plebeculata is 7395.

Subspecies
These two subspecies belong to the species Epirrhoe plebeculata:
 Epirrhoe plebeculata plebeculata
 Epirrhoe plebeculata vivida Barnes & McDunnough

References

Further reading

External links

 

Epirrhoe
Articles created by Qbugbot
Moths described in 1858